Ice Cycles is the second album by the progressive metal group Platypus, released in 2000.

Track listing
 Oh God  – 4:16
 Better Left Unsaid  – 5:24
 The Tower  – 3:30
 Cry  – 6:15
 I Need You  – 4:17
 25 (instrumental)  – 5:09
 Gone  – 6:42
 Partial to the Bean (A Tragic American Quintogy) (instrumental) ( – 10:33 total)
 Intro Pompatous  – 0:21
 Yoko Ono  – 1:27
 Yoko Two-No  – 1:01
 Yoko Three-No  – 2:14
 Platmosis  – 1:16
 Yoko Againo  – 2:08
 Yoko Outro  – 2:07

The album cover lists the last song as one track with 7 parts (parts A through G on the back of the CD case), but the CD player displays 14 total tracks.

Personnel
 Ty Tabor - vocals, guitars
 Derek Sherinian - keyboards
 John Myung -  bass
 Rod Morgenstein - drums

References

2000 albums
Platypus (band) albums